Kriegsman is the surname of:

 Alan M. Kriegsman (1928—2012), American dance critic
 James J. Kriegsmann (1909–1994), celebrity and theatrical photographer
 Mark Kriegsman (born 1966), American entrepreneur